Richard Tourne (born 14 January 1951) is a French speed skater. He competed at the 1972 Winter Olympics and the 1976 Winter Olympics.

References

1951 births
Living people
French male speed skaters
Olympic speed skaters of France
Speed skaters at the 1972 Winter Olympics
Speed skaters at the 1976 Winter Olympics
Place of birth missing (living people)